Emil Dahle (born 30 October 1990) is a Norwegian football midfielder who currently plays for 2. divisjon side Brattvåg.

He hails from Mittet, and played youth football for Åndalsnes and Molde. He made his debut for HamKam in the 2011 Adeccoligaen. Before the 2014 season he moved to Stabæk. He made his league debut for Stabæk in the win against Sogndal in March 2014.

In March 2015 he signed a loan deal with Start to 20 July 2015. Then, on 24 July 2015, he went on loan to Bryne for the rest of the season. Ahead of the 2016 season he returned to HamKam. One year later he returned to his home county and Brattvåg IL.

Career statistics

References

1990 births
Living people
People from Rauma, Norway
Norwegian footballers
Hamarkameratene players
Stabæk Fotball players
IK Start players
Bryne FK players
Brattvåg IL players
Eliteserien players
Norwegian First Division players
Norwegian Second Division players
Association football midfielders
Sportspeople from Møre og Romsdal